Raymond Borderie (30 March 1897 – 12 July 1982) was a French film producer. He produced more than 30 films between 1934 and 1968.

Selected filmography

Les Misérables (1934)
 The Ladies in the Green Hats (1937)
 At Your Command, Madame (1942)
 I Am with You (1943)
 Children of Paradise (1945)
 Alone in the Night (1945)
 The Last Penny (1946)
 Five Red Tulips (1949)
 The Lovers of Verona (1949)
 At the Grand Balcony (1949)
 Miquette (1950)
 Deburau (1951)
 Edward and Caroline (1951)
 Wolves Hunt at Night (1952)
 The Wages of Fear (1953)
 The Proud and the Beautiful (1953)
 Orient Express (1954)
 The Crucible (1957)
 La fièvre monte à El Pao (1959)
 Women Are Like That (1960)
 Ravishing (1960)
 Angélique, Marquise des Anges (1964)
 Marvelous Angelique (1965)
 Angelique and the King (1966)
 Diabolically Yours (1967)
 Le Samourai (1967)

References

External links

1897 births
1982 deaths
French film producers
Film people from Paris